The Washburn Ichabods football program is a college football team that represents Washburn University in the Mid-America Intercollegiate Athletics Association, a part of NCAA Division II.  The team has had 38 head coaches since its first recorded football game in 1891. The current coach is Craig Schurig who first took the position for the 2002 season.

Key

Coaches
Statistics correct as of the end of the 2022 college football season.

See also

 List of people from Topeka, Kansas
 List of Washburn University alumni

Notes

References

Lists of college football head coaches

Kansas sports-related lists